Cairns Aquarium, the first public aquarium built in Australia in 18 years, is home to more than 16,000 specimens and 10 ecosystems. The $54 million, 7,800sq m, three-level facility in Queensland holds 71 tanks including Australia's largest freshwater tank with 400,000 litres of water, a deep sea tank and the world's first true tidal motion tank.
It has 10 lifelike and recreated habitats and is the only aquarium of its type to display endangered or rarely seen endemic species such as the emerald tree monitors, Jardine River painted turtles, ribboned pipefish and scalloped hammerhead sharks.
The aquarium is also an interactive research and education centre and is home to the Cairns Turtle Rehabilitation Centre.

Awards
In 2018, the aquarium won the Master Builder Queensland award for Project of the Year and the award for Leisure Facilities over $10 million.

References

External links

Tourist attractions in Cairns
Aquaria in Australia
Buildings and structures in Cairns
Cairns City, Queensland